"Wherever I Go" is the third single, released in 2018 from Dan Bremnes's album of the same name.

Composition
"Wherever I Go" is originally in the key of D♭ Minor, with a tempo of 89 beats per minute.

Music video
A music video for the single "Wherever I Go" was released on July 13, 2018. The video shows Bremnes travelling the world while singing the song. The video has over two million views on YouTube.

Charts

Weekly charts

Year-end charts

References

External links
 

2018 singles
2018 songs
Gospel songs
American pop songs
Contemporary Christian songs